Jungnim-dong is a dong, neighbourhood of Jung-gu in Seoul, South Korea.

Attractions

Yakhyeon Catholic Church (약현성당 藥峴聖堂)
Son Gi-jeong Park

Transportation 
 Chungjeongno Station of

See also 
Administrative divisions of South Korea
Kim Jeong-ho

References

External links
 Jung-gu Official site in English
 Jung-gu Official site 
 Jung-gu Tour Guide from the Official site 
 Status quo of Jung-gu 
 Resident offices and maps of Jung-gu 
 Jungnim-dong resident office website 

Neighbourhoods of Jung-gu, Seoul